Anna Karenina is a 1935 Metro-Goldwyn-Mayer film adaptation of the 1877 novel Anna Karenina by Leo Tolstoy and directed by Clarence Brown.  The film stars Greta Garbo, Fredric March, Basil Rathbone, and Maureen O'Sullivan. There are several other film adaptations of the novel.

In New York, the film opened at the Capitol Theatre, the site of many prestigious MGM premieres.  The film earned $2,304,000 at the box office, and won the Mussolini Cup for best foreign film at the Venice Film Festival.  Greta Garbo received a New York Film Critics Circle Award for Best Actress for her role as Anna. In addition, the film was ranked #42 on the American Film Institute's list of AFI's 100 Years...100 Passions.

Plot

Anna Karenina (Greta Garbo) is the wife of Czarist official Karenin (Basil Rathbone). While she tries to persuade her brother Stiva (Reginald Owen) from a life of debauchery, she becomes infatuated with dashing military officer Count Vronsky (Fredric March). This indiscreet liaison ruins her marriage and position in 19th century Russian society; she is even prohibited from seeing her own son Sergei (Freddie Bartholomew), with eventual dire results.

Cast

 Greta Garbo as Anna Karenina
 Fredric March as Count Vronsky
 Freddie Bartholomew as Sergei
 Maureen O'Sullivan as Kitty
 May Robson as Countess Vronsky
 Basil Rathbone as Karenin
 Reginald Owen as Stiva
 Phoebe Foster as Dolly
 Reginald Denny as Yashvin
 Gyles Isham as Levin
 Joan Marsh as Lili
 Ethel Griffies as Mme. Kartasov
 Harry Beresford as Matve
 Cora Sue Collins as Tania
 Buster Phelps as Grisha
 Mary Forbes as Princess Sorokina
 Harry Allen as Cord
 Sarah Padden as Governess
 Mischa Auer as Mahotin (uncredited)
 Harry Cording as Officer (uncredited) 
 Olaf Hytten as Butler (uncredited)

Production

Reception
Writing for The Spectator in 1935, Graham Greene made much of Greta Garbo's powerful and theatrical acting in the film, noting that "it is Greta Garbo's personality which 'makes' this film, which fills the mould of the neat respectful adaptation with some kind of sense of the greatness of the novel". Greene found that the pathos that Garbo's acting brings to the picture overwhelms the acting of all supporting cast save that of Basil Rathbone.

Helen Brown Norden from Vanity Fair in a glowing review wrote "Against the glittering background, these people move to their inevitable doom. There seems more of anguish and more of sombre depth in this version than there was in the old silent film (with Garbo and John Gilbert). Garbo still with that remote look of "the implacable Aphrodite" on her face acts with a dignity and a bitter passion which reach a mature climax in the final scene."

The film has received acclaim from modern critics. It holds a 93% approval rating on Rotten Tomatoes, based on 14 reviews.

The film is recognized by American Film Institute in these lists:
 2002: AFI's 100 Years...100 Passions – #42

The film grossed $865,000 in the United States and Canada, and grossed $1,439,000 elsewhere, combined it grossed $2,304,000 and brought MGM a profit of $320,000.

Notes
Garbo also was the lead in the 1927 version of Anna Karenina, released under the title Love.

References

Further reading

External links

 
 
 Anna Karenina at Allmovie
 
 Extensive photo gallery and notes at GarboForever.com

1935 films
1935 romantic drama films
1930s historical romance films
American historical romance films
American romantic drama films
American black-and-white films
Remakes of American films
Sound film remakes of silent films
Films based on Anna Karenina
Romantic period films
Metro-Goldwyn-Mayer films
Films directed by Clarence Brown
Films produced by David O. Selznick
Films about infidelity
Films scored by Herbert Stothart
1930s English-language films
1930s American films